Card sorting is a technique in user experience design in which a person tests a group of subject experts or users to generate a dendrogram (category tree) or folksonomy. It is a useful approach for designing information architecture, workflows, menu structure, or web site navigation paths.

Card sorting uses a relatively low-tech approach. The person conducting the test (usability analyst, user experience designer, etc.) first identifies key concepts and writes them on  index cards or Post-it notes. Test subjects, individually or sometimes as a group, then arrange the cards to represent how they see the structure and relationships of the information.

Groups can be organized as collaborative groups (focus groups) or as repeated individual sorts. The literature discusses appropriate numbers of users needed to produce trustworthy results.

A card sort is commonly undertaken when designing a navigation structure for an environment that offers a variety of content and functions, such as a web site. In that context, the items to organize are those significant in the environment. The way the items are organized should make sense to the target audience and cannot be determined from first principles.

The field of information architecture is founded on the study of the structure of information. If an accepted and standardized taxonomy exists for a subject, it would be natural to apply that taxonomy to organize both the information in the environment, and any navigation to particular subjects or functions. Card sorting is useful when:
 The variety of items to organize is so great that no existing taxonomy is accepted as organizing the items.
 Similarities among the items make them difficult to divide clearly into categories.
 Members of the audience that uses the environment differ significantly in how they view the similarities among items and the appropriate groupings of items.

Basic method

To perform a card sort:
 A person representative of the audience receives a set of index cards with terms written on them.
 This person groups the terms in whatever way they think is logical, and gives each group a category name, either from an existing card or by writing a name on a blank card.
 Testers repeat this process across a group of test subjects.
 The testers later analyze the results to discover patterns.

Variants

Open card sorting
In an open card sort, participants create their own names for the categories. This helps reveal not only how they mentally classify the cards, but also what terms they use for the categories. Open sorting is generative; it is typically used to discover patterns in how participants classify, which in turn helps generate ideas for organizing information.

Closed card sorting
In a closed card sort, participants are provided with a predetermined set of category names. They then assign the index cards to these fixed categories. This helps reveal the degree to which the participants agree on which cards belong under each category. Closed sorting is evaluative; it is typically used to judge whether a given set of category names provides an effective way to organize a given collection of content.

Reverse card sorting
In a reverse card sort (more popularly called tree testing), an existing structure of categories and sub-categories is tested. Users are given tasks and are asked to complete them navigating a collection of cards. Each card contains the names of subcategories related to a category, and the user should find the card most relevant to the given task starting from the main card with the top-level categories. This ensures that the structure is evaluated in isolation, nullifying the effects of navigational aids, visual design, and other factors. Reverse card sorting is evaluative—it judges whether a predetermined hierarchy provides a good way to find information.

Modified-Delphi card sorting
Created by Celeste Paul, The Modified-Delphi card sort is based on the Delphi method. Rather than each participant creating their own card sort, only the first participant does a full card sort of organizing and arranging items. The next participant iterates on the first participant's model, then the third participant iterates on the second's model, and so on. The idea is that with each iteration the card sort gets more refined with fewer participants and consensus is built sooner.

Analysis
Various methods can be used to analyze the data. The purpose of the analysis is to extract patterns from the population of test subjects, so that a common set of categories and relationships emerges. This common set is then incorporated into the design of the environment, either for navigation or for other purposes. Card sorting is also evaluated through dendrograms. There is some indication that different evaluation methods for card sorting provide different results.

Card sorting is an established technique with an emerging literature.

Online (remote) card sorting
A number of web-based tools are available to perform card sorting. The perceived advantage of web-based card sorting is that it reaches a larger group of participants at a lower cost. The software can also help analyze the sort results. A perceived disadvantage of a remote card sort is the lack of personal interaction between card sort participants and the card sort administrator, which may produce valuable insights.

See also
 Cluster analysis
 Group concept mapping
 Q methodology

References

Further reading
 
 
 

Folksonomy
Human–computer interaction
Qualitative research
Survey methodology
Usability